The Lowell Institute (est. 1836) is an educational foundation in Boston, Massachusetts, United States, providing for free public lectures, and endowed by the bequest of $237,000 left by John Lowell, Jr., who died in 1836. The Institute had an unusual mode of governance: a single trustee who was empowered to appoint his successor and who was, in the language of Lowell's will, "always choose in preference to all others some male descendant of my grandfather, John Lowell, provided there be one who is competent to hold the office of trustee, and of the name of Lowell".

Having been extremely successful for more than a century, audiences for Lowell Institute began to wane, and the newly appointed Trustee, Ralph Lowell, in co-operation with Harvard President James B. Conant founded the public radio station WGBH Boston in hopes of reaching larger audiences. WGBH Boston evolved under Ralph Lowell's, and Lowell's son John's, direction to become what it is today.

Trustees
 John Lowell, Jr., (1814–1836)
 John Amory Lowell, (1836–1881)
 Augustus Lowell, (1881–1900)
 A. Lawrence Lowell, (1900–1943)
 Ralph Lowell, (1943–1978)
 John Lowell (businessman), (1978–2011)
 William A. Lowell (attorney and Practice Group Leader with Choate Hall & Stewart LLP) (2011-)

Portrait Gallery

See also
 Lowell Institute
 Lowell family

References

External links
 WGBH Boston www.wgbh.org
 Public lectures page at forum-network.org
 The Historic Genealogy of the Lowells of America from 1639 to 1899

List of Trustees of Lowell Institute